The 1938 American Karakoram expedition to K2, more properly called the "First American Karakoram expedition", investigated several routes for reaching the summit of K2, an unclimbed mountain at  the second highest mountain in the world. Charlie Houston was the leader of what was a small and happily united climbing party. However, by then their supply lines were very extended, they were short of food and the monsoon seemed imminent. It was decided that Houston and Paul Petzoldt would make the last push to get as close to the summit as they could and then rejoin the rest of the party in descent. In favorable weather, they were able to identify a suitable site for a higher camp and a clear route to the summit.

The expedition was regarded as a success and no one had suffered a serious injury. The book the team jointly wrote, Five Miles High , was also successful. The following year the 1939 American Karakoram expedition took advantage of the reconnaissance to get very near the summit but their descent led to tragedy.

Background

K2 

K2 is on the border between what in 1938 was the British Raj of India (now Pakistan) and the Republic of China. At  it is the highest point of the Karakoram range and the second highest mountain in the world. The mountain had been spotted in 1856 by the Great Trigonometrical Survey to Kashmir and by 1861 Henry Godwin-Austen had reached the Baltoro Glacier and was able to get a clear view of K2 from the slopes of Masherbrum. He could see the descending glacier eventually drained to the Indus River and so the mountain was in the British Empire. K2 is further north than the Himalayan mountains so the climate is colder; the Karakoram range is wider than the Himalayan so more ice and snow is trapped there.

History of climbing on the mountain

In 1890 Roberto Lerco had entered the Baltoro Muztagh region of the Karakoram. He had reached the foot of K2 and may even have climbed a short way up its south-east spur but he did not leave an account of his journey.
The first serious attempt to climb the mountain was in 1902 by a party including Aleister Crowley, later to become notorious as "the Wickedest Man in the World". The expedition examined ascent routes both north and south of the mountain and made the best progress up the northeast ridge before they were forced to abandon their efforts. Since that time K2 has developed the reputation of being a more difficult mountain to climb than Mount Everest – every route to the summit is tough.

This route later became known as the Abruzzi Ridge (or Abruzzi Spur) and eventually became regarded as the normal route to the summit. In 1929 Aimone de Savola-Aosta, the nephew of the Duke of the Abruzzi, led an expedition to explore the upper Baltoro Glacier, near to K2.

Preparation for 1938 expedition

American  Alpine Club plans for 1938 and 1939 expeditions 
At the American Alpine Club's 1937 meeting, Charlie Houston and Fritz Wiessner were the main speakers and Wiessner proposed an expedition to climb K2 for the first time, an idea that was strongly supported. The American Alpine Club (AAC) president applied for an expedition permit via the Department of State – the British colonial authorities approved the plan for a reconnaissance, possibly leading to an attempt, in 1938 to be followed by an expedition in 1939 if the first attempt failed. Although Wiessner had been expected to lead the first expedition – he was probably the best American mountaineer and climber at the time – he backed down and suggested Houston replace him. Houston had considerable mountaineering experience – he had organized and achieved the first ascent of Alaska's Mount Foraker in 1934 and had been a climbing member on the British–American Himalayan Expedition of 1936 which reached the top of Nanda Devi, which was then and in 1938 was still the highest summit to have been climbed. Their primary aim was to reconnoiter the three main ridges of K2, and make a summit attempt if possible.

Team members 
Bob Bates was a friend of Houston's and a fellow student at Harvard – he had twice been mountaineering in Alaska. Richard Burdsall had successfully climbed Mount Gongga in Sichuan, China. Bill House had been with Wiessner on the first ascent of Mount Waddington in British Columbia. Paul Petzoldt was a very experienced mountain guide and rock climber in Wyoming's Tetons. Unlike the others who were ivy League graduates, Petzoldt had not been to college. Norman Streatfeild was a British army officer based in India who had been transport officer on a French Karakoram expedition. He was not a highly experienced mountaineer but was good at organising the porters and at deploying the equipment.

Equipment 
It was not yet known that pemmican is far too fatty for high altitudes. They chose hard biscuits that did not soften when moist. Dried fruit and vegetables were beginning to be available and they took cereal along with powdered milk. 

Boots were leather with hobnails, specially made for them in England. Climbing ropes were manila and hemp – no nylon. The design of the ice ax was for a long wooden shaft with a steelhead forming a pick and adze. Following the British example, and unlike Wiessner's expedition next year, they took very little technical climbing equipment – only ten pitons were thought sufficient. Petzoldt favoured modern devices but his professional climbing experience was not considered to be in his favor. Because he could not afford the trip, Petzoldt had been funded by another AAC member but he felt forced to spend some of his limited funds by secretly purchasing fifty pitons while he passed through Paris.

Voyage and trek to K2 Base Camp

The expedition set sail on April 14 from New York to Bombay via Europe. They reached Rawalpindi on May 9 and drove just north of Srinagar to Wayul, at that time at the end of the road. At Srinagar they had met with the six Sherpas they had hired in advance and who had traveled from Darjeeling. Sherpas are of Tibetan and Nepali origin but those seeking a career in mountain guiding based themselves at Darjeeling in India where pre-war British Everest expeditions had always done their recruiting. A Sherpa was attached to each sahib – Pasang Kikuli, who had been with Houston on the British–American Nanda Devi Expedition in 1936, was again with Houston and was the sirdar (chief Sherpa). The other Sherpas were Pemba Kitar, Tse Tendrup, Ang Pemba, Sonam, and Phinsoo. Three Kashmiri shikaris (huntsmen) were appointed to maintain Base Camp: Ahdoo the cook, a major-domo and a valet.

They set off with less than one hundred porters and twenty-five ponies which could only be taken as far as Yuno where they were replaced by seventy-five additional porters.
Local porters were hired just for a few days before new ones were taken on. At Yuno the porters refused to work for the pay offered so Bates and Streatfeild rafted back down to Skardu,  down the torrential Shigar and Indus rivers, to get more helpful porters. At Hoto they all had to cross the Braldu River over a -deep gorge across a "rope" bridge made from plaited willow twigs. Askole was reached on June 3 but there Petzoldt went down with what was later diagnosed as dengue fever so Houston, who was a doctor, stayed with him while the others went on. They climbed the snout of the Baltoro Glacier and then reached Urdukas, a solitary grassy oasis just off the glacier which is the farthest local herdsmen go for grazing. At this point, Houston and Petzoldt caught up with the main party.

On June 12 they reached their site for Base Camp where the porters were paid off with instructions to return in 45 days.

Reconnaissance of possible ascent routes
Benefiting from the work done twenty-nine years earlier by the Duke of the Abruzzi expedition, Houston's party set out to review the various possible approaches to the summit.

1909 Duke of the Abruzzi exploration
The Abruzzi party had included the photographer Vittorio Sella whose magnificent photographs were used and admired by later generations of explorers, giving a fine impression of the mountain faces and ridges of K2 and its surrounding mountains. At Concordia, where the Baltoro and  Godwin-Austen glaciers merge, they had traveled up the latter. From what became the traditional base campsite they explored K2's northeast ridge, which they considered hopeless, so attempted to climb up the southeast ridge – now called the Abruzzi Ridge or Spur. Two Courmayeur guides reached about  but this only proved the party as a whole would not manage the climb. Again they were thwarted so as a consolation they climbed high on Chogolisa, to about  – the highest altitude ever reached and one that would not be exceeded until the 1922 British Mount Everest expedition.

1938 reconnaissance

Throughout the two weeks in June 1938 allocated to reconnaissance, there was stormy weather. Bates and Streatfeild ventured up the Godwin-Austen Glacier from where the south face and northeast ridge of K2 seemed impossible. They explored the Savoia Glacier but on three occasions failed to reach the Savoia Pass,  the way being blocked with crevasses and walls of ice. They had been hoping to find a route from this side because the 1909 survey had observed that the rock strata on the northwest ridge provided a step-like climbing route whereas on the other side, the Abruzzi Ridge, the rocks sloped downward giving insecure footing and poor places to pitch tents.
 
Above this, the summit pyramid could be glimpsed where there was a hanging glacier threatening both the northeast and Abruzzi ridges. On June 28 Petzoldt and House favored attempting the Abruzzi Ridge whereas Houston and Burdsall preferred investigating the northeast ridge further. On the Abruzzi Ridge it was difficult to find anywhere at all suitable for pitching a tent until on July 2 Petzoldt found a small saddle point hidden away but suitable for several tents. This decided the line of attack and the location was to become Camp II.

Abruzzi Ridge line of ascent

Progress up mountain 

Camp II was established on July 3  but right at the start, there was a serious accident when a rock fell on a can containing most of the supply of cooking fuel, spilling all the oil. Streatfeild led a small party to the foot of Gasherbrum hoping to find the supply left by a French group in 1936. It turned out porters had looted the fuel but Streatfeild in turn acquired some cans of food. Pemba Kitar, and the cook, Ahdoo, went off down to Askole, a march expected to take seven days, to get porters to bring up a supply of firewood. Only eight days later they arrived back at Base Camp with ten porters bringing a massive amount of cedarwood. By using this for heat at Base Camp there was sufficient fuel on the mountain.

While this was going on supplies were being carried up the Ridge and, in awkward places, fixed ropes were being placed. Petzoldt's pitons were of tremendous help. Jumars had not yet been invented so the climbing technique was to knot the hemp ropes in places and simply heave upwards, hand over hand. Pasang Kikuli, Phinsoo and Tse Tendrup did most of the load-carrying as well as shifting rocks to level the platforms for tents. As it turned out Camp III was sited in a dangerous position threatened by rock falls. Rocks dislodged by climbers higher up the mountain fell  punching holes in all three tents but fortunately no one was hit. At this stage Streatfeild, Burdsall and three Sherpas left to go on further reconnaissance around the mountain and only Pasang Kikuli was the only Sherpa to go any higher up the mountain.

Camp IV was close to the foot of an  vertical cliff and on July 14 Bill House managed to surmount the cliff (which they called House's Chimney) taking two and a half hours. In those days pitons were of rather soft metal and were ineffective on a hard rock so at  House effectively had to free climb his way up the chimney without protection because there were no alternatives for getting further up the ridge. It had been the hardest rock climb at that time at any comparable altitude. There was then rapid progress through the Black Pyramid to reach above  on July 19.

With everyone together at Camp VI they reviewed their situation – there was only ten days of fuel and food remaining. Concerned in case bad weather would delay a descent, they decided by a vote that Houston and Petzoldt would be the climbers to up to as high as possible. It was thought that the mountaineering was now technically too difficult for Sherpas so that only the four sahibs would carry supplies up to establish Camp VII – however they agreed to include Pasang Kikuli after he had pleaded with them. With Houston and Petzoldt at Camp VII on July 20, Houston was sure a summit attempt would be out of the question. They then discovered no matches had been included in their supplies but fortunately Houston had nine matches in his pocket. After preparing them carefully with grease they got the stove to light with the third match. In the morning three more matches were used for lighting the breakfast stove. On July 21, heading without camping gear towards the Shoulder in knee-deep snow Petzoldt was the stronger climber.

At that point, Houston could go no higher and they turned back at 16:00 after Petzoldt had reached about  where he found a site suitable for a tent for a future expedition. As darkness fell they got back to their tent where they managed to light the stove with their third and last remaining match. Below Camp III on the way down Pasang Kikuli shouted out when he spotted a large rock shooting down towards them and they were only just able to take cover in time. He explained that the "snowmen" had warned him to look up just at the time.

Return to Srinagar and assessment

The party got back to Base Camp by July 25, leaving the fixed ropes in place, and made the six-day trek back to Askole. Eleven more days took them to Srinagar – they were able to take a shorter route over the Skoro La pass and across the Deosai Plains because the snow had cleared since their outward trek.

Petzoldt stayed on in India at an ashram but after the leader of the ashram (who was himself American) died in controversial circumstances he returned hurriedly home after there was the possibility of a charge of manslaughter.

The expedition was relatively small-scale and low-cost compared with the eight-thousander expeditions of the 1950s but it found a good route – the best route – to the summit, scaling the most difficult point and getting back without serious injury. It was a well-run, united and successful reconnaissance. Ed Viesturs has described it as "a magnificent achievement". Speaking of the book of the expedition, Five Miles High , Curran says that it shows a harmonious expedition at its very best and that it should be compulsory reading for anyone contemplating going to K2".  Sale describes it as "one of the great expedition books".

Notes

References

Citations

Works cited 

 page numbers from Aldiko ebook reader Android app showing entire book as 305 pages.
 page numbers from Aldiko ebook reader Android app showing entire book as 284 pages.

Further reading/viewing

Accounts by 1938 expedition

  PDF version (94 MB)

Background
 The video is hosted on Vimeo at https://vimeo.com/54661540

 (primarily about the 1953 K2 expedition but also discussing that of 1938)

K2
Karakoram expedition
Expeditions from the United States
American Karakoram expedition to K2, 1938
American Karakoram expedition to K2, 1938
1938 Italian Karakoram expedition to K2